Qurghan may refer to:
Qurghan, Iran
Qurghan, Isfahan, Iran
Qurghan, Semnan, Iran
Qurghan District, in Afghanistan